Tokino Minoru (Japanese : トキノミノル, May 2, 1948 - June 20, 1951) was a Japanese Thoroughbred racehorse, who was an undefeated winner of his 10 race starts, which included the Tokyo Yushun (Japanese Derby).

Breeding
He was sired by Theft (GB), a son of Tetratema (IRE), out of Daini Tyrant's Queen, a daughter of Soldennis. He was a brother to Daring and a half-brother to Izutada, by Tokino Chikara. Theft was the sire of Bostonian who also won the Tokyo Yushun (Derby). Tokino Minoru was inbred in the third and fourth generations (3m x 4f) to The Tetrarch.

Racing career 
 Major racing wins
 1950 Asahi Hai Sansai Stakes, Nakayama Turf 1100m
 1951 Satsuki Sho (Japanese 2000 Guineas), Nakayama Turf 2000m
 1951 Tokyo Yushun (Japanese Derby), Tokyo Turf 2400m

He died in 1951 from tetanus, just 17 days after winning the Derby.

Honours
An important three-year-old stakes race called Tokino Minoru Kinen (Memorial) is named in his honour and held at the Tokyo Racecourse. Tokino Minoru was inducted into the Japan Racing Association Hall of Fame in 1984.

Pedigree

See also
List of leading Thoroughbred racehorses

References

1948 racehorse births
1951 racehorse deaths
Racehorses bred in Japan
Racehorses trained in Japan
Undefeated racehorses
Thoroughbred family 14-f
Byerley Turk sire line
Deaths from tetanus